Sheila Raquel Abed de Zavala is a Paraguayan lawyer and politician.

Biography
Abed studied law at the National University of Asunción; afterwards she obtained a Master in Environmental Law at the Université de Limoges. She has experience in environmental topics in the framework of the United Nations.

On 15 August 2013 she was sworn in as Minister of Justice and Labor of Paraguay in the cabinet of President Horacio Cartes. In April 2020, alongside international affairs experts Claudia S. de Windt and Maria Amparo Alba, Abed founded the Inter-American Institute on Justice and Sustainability (IIJS) in the city of Washington, D.C., in United States of America where the organization has its headquarters.

References

External links
 Minister Sheila Abed

Universidad Nacional de Asunción alumni
21st-century Paraguayan lawyers
University of Limoges alumni
Justice ministers of Paraguay
Labor ministers
Living people
Year of birth missing (living people)
Paraguayan women lawyers
21st-century Paraguayan women politicians
21st-century Paraguayan politicians
Female justice ministers
Women government ministers of Paraguay